Åke Vilhelm Carl Pleijel (10 August 1913 – 24 September 1989) was a Swedish mathematician.

He completed his Ph.D. in mathematics at Stockholm University in 1940 (with Torsten Carleman as supervisor), and later became Professor of Mathematics at Uppsala University.

Åke Vilhelm Carl Pleijel published the paper  in which the Minakshisundaram–Pleijel zeta function was introduced.

References

External links

1913 births
1989 deaths
Stockholm University alumni
20th-century Swedish mathematicians
Members of the Royal Swedish Academy of Sciences